Sumbawa Regency is a Regency (Kabupaten) of the Indonesian Province of West Nusa Tenggara. It is located on the island of Sumbawa and covers an area of 6,643.98 km2 following the separation on 18 December 2003 of what were until then its westernmost five districts to form the newly-created West Sumbawa Regency. It includes the substantial island of Moyo, lying off the north coast of Sumbawa. The population of the Regency at the 2010 Census was 415,789, which rose at the 2020 Census to 509,753; the official estimate as at mid 2021 was 517,777. The capital is the town of Sumbawa Besar.

Administrative districts 
Sumbawa Regency is divided into twenty-four administrative districts (kecamatan), listed below with their areas and their populations at the 2010 Census and the 2020 Census, together with the official estimates as at mid 2021. The table also includes the locations of the district administrative centres, the number of administrative villages (rural desa and urban kelurahan) in each district, and its postal code(s).

Note: (a) Labuhan Badas District comprises the substantial island of Pulau Moyo, the smaller Pulau Medang to its west, and the small Pulau Sakonci to its northeast off the coast of the Sanggar Peninsula. Note that the three districts with "Moyo" in their names do not include any part of Moyo Island, but are situated to its south on Sumbawa Island.

The 8 villages comprising Sumbawa (town) district are classed as urban kelurahan; the other 157 villages are all classed as rural desa.

Sister Districts 
 Kulim, Malaysia

References

External links 
 

Regencies of West Nusa Tenggara